Bobby Darin Sings The Shadow of Your Smile is an album by American singer Bobby Darin, released in 1966. It included all the Oscar nominated songs from 1966. It was his first album on the Atlantic label after leaving Capitol Records.

Bobby Darin Sings The Shadow of Your Smile was reissued on CD in 2007 along with In a Broadway Bag (Mame).

Reception

In his Allmusic review, critic JT Griffith wrote “Darin flexed his musical muscles and covered them all... While only making a small dent in the charts, The Shadow of Your Smile was a hit with the critics.”

Track listing
"The Shadow of Your Smile" (Johnny Mandel, Paul Francis Webster) – 2:15
"The Sweetheart Tree" (Henry Mancini) – 2:07
"I Will Wait for You" (Michel Legrand, Jacques Demy) – 2:31
"The Ballad of Cat Ballou" (Jerry Livingston, Mack David) – 2:30
"What's New Pussycat?" (Burt Bacharach, Hal David) – 2:10
"Rainin'" (Bobby Darin) – 2:49
"Lover, Come Back to Me" (Sigmund Romberg, Oscar Hammerstein II) – 2:22
"Cute" (Neal Hefti) – 2:18
"After You've Gone" (Turner Layton, Henry Creamer) – 3:12
"It's Only a Paper Moon" (Harold Arlen, E. Y. Harburg, Billy Rose) – 2:23
"Liza (All the Clouds'll Roll Away)" (George Gershwin, Ira Gershwin, Gus Kahn) – 2:48

Personnel
Bobby Darin – vocals
Richard Wess – arrangements
Shorty Rogers – arrangements

References

1966 albums
Bobby Darin albums
Atlantic Records albums
Albums arranged by Shorty Rogers